More Power to Ya is the fifth studio album of the Christian rock band, Petra. It was released in 1982. This was the first album to feature Louie Weaver as the official drummer. It also features the vocals of bassist Mark Kelly in the song "Disciple". The album climbed to number 3 on the Billboard Top Inspirational Albums chart.

Track listing

Backmasking 

This album included the use of the backmasking technique. According to many people, backmasking was being used in rock music to include hidden satanic messages. This caused a backlash from the Christian community against the genre. In an attempt to divert people obsessed with this from it, Petra used the technique with the intent to send a message. During the song "Judas' Kiss", from 0:00 to 0:03, the phrase "What are you lookin' for the devil for when you oughta be lookin' for the Lord?" is heard when played in backward motion.

Personnel 
Petra
 Greg X. Volz – lead vocals
 Bob Hartman – guitars
 John Slick – keyboards, backing vocals, synthesizer programming, arranging
 Mark Kelly – bass guitar, backing vocals, co-lead vocals on "Disciple"
 Louie Weaver – drums

Additional musicians
 Steve Porcaro – synthesizers, synthesizer programming

Production
 Jonathan David Brown – producer, track arrangements, recording at Indian Creek Recording, Uvalde, Texas and Rivendell Recorders, Pasadena, Texas, mixing at Rivendell Recorders
 Brian Tankersley – technical assistance
 Steve Hall – mastering at MCA/Whitney, Glendale, California
 Petra – track arrangements
 T & T Designs – art direction
 Lisa Williams – layout 
 Randy Rogers – illustration 
 Petragram – sleeve illustration
 Bob Thigpen – sleeve photos

Charts

References 

1982 albums
Petra (band) albums